Innocents in Paris is a 1953 British-French international co-production comedy film produced by Romulus Films, directed by Gordon Parry and starring Alastair Sim, Ronald Shiner, Claire Bloom, Margaret Rutherford, Claude Dauphin, and Jimmy Edwards, and also featuring James Copeland. Popular French comedy actor Louis de Funès appears as a taxi driver, and there are cameo appearances by Christopher Lee, Laurence Harvey and Kenneth Williams. The writer and producer was Anatole de Grunwald, born in Russia in 1910, who fled to Britain with his parents in 1917. He had a long career there as a writer and producer, including the films The Way to the Stars, The Winslow Boy, Doctor's Dilemma, Libel, and The Yellow Rolls-Royce.

Plot
The film is a romantic comedy about a group of Britons flying out from The London Airport for a weekend in Paris in 1953 in a British European Airways Airspeed Ambassador. An English diplomat (Sim) is on a working trip to obtain an agreement with his Russian counterpart (Illing); a Royal Marine bandsman (Shiner) has a night out on the tiles after winning a pool of the French currency held by all the Marines in his band; a young woman (Bloom) finds romance with an older Frenchman (Dauphin) who gives her a tour of Paris; an amateur artist (Rutherford) searches out fellow painters on the Left Bank and in the Louvre; a hearty Englishman (Edwards) spends the entire weekend in an English-style pub; and a Battle of Normandy veteran (Copeland) is an archetypal Scotsman in kilt and Tam o' Shanter who finds love with a young French woman (Gérard).

The film displays the mores and manners of the British, and, to a lesser extent, the French, in the early nineteen-fifties. At this time, Britons were allowed to take only £25 out of the country, as £5 British cash and traveller's cheques, and there are several scenes showing how the travellers dealt with this. The film also features a Russian nightclub (of which there were several in Paris at the time), with Ludmila Lopato, a Russian tzigane chanteuse, singing the original Russian version of the song that became "Those were the Days", which became a hit record for Mary Hopkin.

Cast 
 Alastair Sim: Sir Norman Baker
 Ronald Shiner: Dicky Bird
 Claire Bloom: Susan Robbins
 Margaret Rutherford: Gwladys Inglott
 Claude Dauphin: Max de Lorne
 Jimmy Edwards: Captain George Stilton
 Mara Lane: Gloria Delaney
 James Copeland: Andy MacGrégor "L'Écossais"
 Gaby Bruyère: Josette
 Monique Gérard: Raymonde
 Peter Illing: Panitov
 Colin Gordon: Customs officer
 Kenneth Kove: Bickerstaff
 Frank Muir: Stilton's friend
 Philip Stainton: Nobby Clarke
 Peter Jones: Langton
 Stringer Davis: Arbuthnot
 Richard Wattis: Wilkinson, Sir Norman Baker's secretary
 The Band of Plymouth Group Royal Marines
 Louis de Funès: Célestin
 Albert Dinan: Louvre doorman
 Jean Richard
 Maurice Baquet
 Ludmilla Lopato: Chanteuse
 Georgette Anys: Madame Célestin
 Polycarpe Pavloff
 Irène de Strozzi
 Grégoire Aslan: Carpet seller
 The Can-Can Dancers from The Moulin Rouge, Paris

Uncredited (in alphabetical order)
 Reginald Beckwith: Photographer
 Joan Benham: Receptionist
 Max Dalban: Butcher
 Laurence Harvey: François
 Hamilton Keene: Reporter
 Christopher Lee: Lieutenant Whitlock
 Andreas Malandrinos: French customs officer
 Bill Shine: Customs officer
 Toke Townley: Airport porter
 Kenneth Williams: Window dresser at London Airport

References

1953 films
1953 comedy films
Films directed by Gordon Parry
Films set in Paris
Films shot in Paris
British comedy films
Films with screenplays by Anatole de Grunwald
Films produced by Anatole de Grunwald
British black-and-white films
Films scored by Joseph Kosma
Films shot at Station Road Studios, Elstree
1950s English-language films
1950s British films